This is a list of state leaders in the 2nd century (101–200) AD.

Africa

Africa: East

Kingdom of Aksum (complete list) –
Zoskales, King (c.100)

Africa: Northeast

Kingdom of Kush (complete list) –
Tamelerdeamani, King (2nd century)
Adeqatali, King (2nd century)
Takideamani, King (2nd century)
Tarekeniwal, King (2nd century)
Amanikhalika, King (2nd century)
Aritenyesbokhe, King (2nd century)
Amanikhareqerem, King (2nd century)

Americas

Americas: Mesoamerica

Maya civilization
Tikal (complete list) –
Foliated Jaguar, Ajaw (2nd–3rd century)

Asia

Asia: Central

Mongolia

Xianbei state –
Cizhiqian, Chieftain (121–132)
Tanshihuai, Chieftain (156–181)
Helian, Chieftain (181–185)
Kuitou, Chieftain (185–187)
Budugen, Chieftain (187–234)

Asia: East
China
Eastern Han, China (complete list) –
He, Emperor (89–105)
Shang, Emperor (106)
An, Emperor (106–125)
Marquess of Beixiang, Marquess (125)
Shun, Emperor (125–144)
Chong, Emperor (144–145)
Zhi, Emperor (145–146)
Huan, Emperor (146–168)
Ling, Emperor (168–189)
Liu Bian, Emperor (189)
Xian, Emperor (189–220)

Japan
Yamatai –
Himiko, Queen (189-248)

Korea
Baekje (complete list) –
Giru, King (77–128)
Gaeru, King (128–166)
Chogo, King (166–214)

Geumgwan Gaya (complete list) –
Geodeung, King (199–259)

Goguryeo (complete list) –
Taejodae, King (53–146)
Chadae, King (146–165)
Sindae, King (165–179)
Gogukcheon, King (179–197)
Sansang, King (197–227)

Silla (complete list) –
Pasa, King (80–112)
Jima, King (112–134)
Ilseong, King (134–154)
Adalla, King (154–184)
Beolhyu, King (184–196)
Naehae, King (196–230)

Asia: Southeast

Cambodia
Funan –
Hùntián, King (1st/2nd century)
Hùnpánkuàng, King (2nd century)
Pánpán, King (late 2nd century)

Indonesia: Java

Jawadwipa –
Diao bian, King (fl.132)

Salakanagara –
Dewawarman I, King (130–mid 2nd century)
Dewawarman II, King (late 2nd century)
Dewawarman III, King (2nd–3rd century)

Vietnam
Champa (complete list) –
Khu Liên, King (192–mid 3rd century)

Asia: South

India

Chera dynasty (complete list) –
Uthiyan Cheralathan, King (c.105–130)
Nedum Cheralathan, King (c.130–188)
Cenkuttuvan, King (c.188–244)

Kushan Empire (complete list) –
Vima Kadphises, Ruler/Emperor (c.95–c.127)
Kanishka the Great, Ruler/Emperor (127–c.140)
Vāsishka, Ruler/Emperor (c.140–c.160)
Huvishka, Ruler/Emperor (c.160–c.190)
Vasudeva I, Ruler/Emperor (c.190–230s)

Nagas of Padmavati (complete list) –
Vrisha-naga, Naga (late 2nd century)
Bhima-naga, Naga (c.210–230)

Satavahana dynasty (Purana-based chronology) –
Shivasvati, King (78–106)
Gautamiputra Satkarni, King (106–130)
Vasisthiputra/ Pulumavi III, King (130–158)
Shiva Sri Satakarni, King (158–165)
Shivaskanda Satakarni, King (165–172)
Sri Yajna Satakarni, King (172–201)

Northern Satraps (complete list) –
Kharapallana, Great Satrap (c.130)
Vanaspara, Satrap (c.130)

Western Satraps (complete list) –
Bhumaka, Satrap (?–119)
Nahapana, Satrap (119–124)
Chastana, Satrap (c.78–130)
Jayadaman, Satrap (c.130)
Rudradaman I, Satrap (c.130–150)
Damajadasri I, Satrap (170–175)
Jivadaman, Satrap (178–181, 197–199)
Rudrasimha I, Satrap (180–188, 191–197)
Satyadaman, Satrap (197–198)
Jivadaman, Satrap (197–199)
Rudrasena I, Satrap (200–222)

Pakistan

Indo-Parthian Kingdom (complete list) –
Pacores, King (100–135)
Sanabares, King (135–160)

Paratarajas (complete list) –
Yolamira, Raja (c.125–150)
Bagamira, Raja (c.150)
Arjuna, Raja (c.150–160)
Hvaramira, Raja (c.160–175)
Mirahvara, Raja (c.175–185)
Miratakhma, Raja (c.185–200)

Sri Lanka

Anuradhapura Kingdom (complete list) –
Vasabha, King (66–110)
Vankanasika Tissa, King (110–113)
Gajabahu I, King (113–135)
Mahallaka Naga, King (135–141)
Bhatika Tissa, King (141–165)
Kanittha Tissa, King (165–193)
Cula Naga, King (193–195)
Kuda Naga, King (195–196)
Siri Naga I, King (196–215)

Asia: West

Corduene (complete list) –
Manisarus, King (c.115)

Judea –
Simon bar Kokhba, Nasi, Prince (132–135)

Nabataean kingdom (complete list) –
Rabbel II Soter, King (70/71 to 106)

Osroene (complete list) –
Sanatruk, client King under Rome (91–109)
Abgar VII bar Ezad, client King under Rome (109–116)
Roman interregnum (116–118)
Yalur, Co-ruler, client King under Rome (118–122)
Parthamaspates, Co-ruler, client King under Rome (118–123)
Ma'nu VII bar Ezad, client King under Rome (123–139)
|Ma'nu VIII bar Ma'nu, client King under Rome (139–163)
Wa'il bar Sahru, client King under Rome (163–165)
Ma'nu VIII bar Ma'nu (165–167)
Abgar VIII, client King under Rome (167–177)
Abgar IX, client King under Rome (177–212)

Parthian Empire (complete list) –
Pacorus II, Great King, Shah (78–105)
Vologases III, Great King, Shah (105–147)
Osroes I, Great King, Shah (109–116)
Parthamaspates, Great King, Shah (116–117)
Sanatruces II, client King under Rome (116–117)
Osroes I, Great King, Shah (117–129)
Vologases III, Great King, Shah (129–140)
Mithridates IV, Great King, Shah (129–140)
Vologases IV, Great King, Shah (147–191)
Osroes II, Great King, Shah (191)
Vologases V, Great King, Shah (191–208)

Adiabene (complete list) –
Meharaspes, client King under Parthia (?–116)
Narsai, client King under Parthia (170–200)	
Narsai of Adiabene, client King under Parthia (c.191–200)

Characene (complete list) –
Pakoros II, client King under Parthia (80–101/02)
Attambelos VI, client King under Parthia (c.101/02–105/06)
Theonesios IV, client King under Parthia (c.110/11–112/113)
Attambelos VII, client King under Parthia (113/14–117)
Meredates, client King under Parthia (c.131–150/51)
Orabazes II, client King under Parthia (c.150/51–165)
Abinergaios II, client King under Parthia (c.165–180)
Attambelos VIII, client King under Parthia (c.180–195)
Maga, client King under Parthia (c.195–210)
Abinergaos III, client King under Parthia (c.210–222)

Elymais (complete list) –
Orodes III, client King under Parthia (c.90–c.100)
Kamnaskires-Orodes, client King under Parthia (c.100–c.120)
Ariobarzanes, client King under Parthia (c.125)
Osroes, client King under Parthia (c.125–c.130)
Unknown client King under Parthia I, client King under Parthia (c.130–c.140)
Orodes IV, client King under Parthia (c.140–c.160)
Abarbasi, client King under Parthia (c.160–c.170)
Orodes V, client King under Parthia (c.170–c.180)
Vologases, client King under Parthia (c.180–c.190)
Unknown client King under Parthia (c.190–c.210)

Europe

Europe: Balkans
Dacia (complete list) –
Decebalus, King (87–106)

Europe: Central
Marcomanni – 
Ballomar, King (166–178)

Europe: East
Bosporan Kingdom (complete list) –
Sauromates I, client king under Rome (93–123)
Cotys II, client king under Rome (123–131)
Rhoemetalces, client king under Rome (131–153)
Eupator, client king under Rome (154–170)
Sauromates II, client king under Rome (172–210)

Europe: Southcentral
Roman Empire (complete list) –
Trajan, Emperor (98– 117)
Hadrian, Emperor (117–138)
Antoninus Pius, Emperor (138–161)
Lucius Verus, Emperor (161–169)
Marcus Aurelius, Emperor (161–180)
Commodus, Emperor (177–192)
Pertinax, Emperor (193)
Didius Julianus, Emperor (193)
Septimius Severus, Emperor (193–211)
Caracalla, Emperor (198–217)

See also: List of Roman consuls#2nd century

Eurasia: Caucasus
Armenia: Arsacid dynasty (complete list) –
Sanatruk, King (88–110)
Axidares, client King under Rome (110–113)
Parthamasiris, client King under Rome (113–114)
Interregnum under Rome 
Vologases I, client King under Rome (117/8–144)
Sohaemus, client King under Rome (144–161, 163/4–186?)
Bakur, client King under Rome (161–164)
Vologases II, client King under Rome (186–198)
Khosrov I, client King under Rome (198–217)

Kingdom of Iberia (Kartli) (complete list) –
Mihrdat I, King (58–106)
Amazasp I, King (106–116)
Pharasmanes II, the Valiant, King (117–132)
Ghadam, King (132–135)
Pharasmanes III, King (138–161)
Amazasp II, King (185–189)
Rev I, the Just, King (189–216)

Lazica (complete list) –
Malassas, vassal King under Rome (c. 130)
Pacorus client King under Rome (138–161)

See also
List of political entities in the 2nd century

References 

Leaders
 
-